The rufous-bellied chachalaca (Ortalis wagleri) is a species of bird in the family Cracidae, the chachalacas, guans, and curassows. It is endemic to western Mexico.

Taxonomy and systematics

The rufous-bellied chachalaca was at one time considered a subspecies of the West Mexican chachalaca (Ortalis poliocephala). It is monotypic, though the Sonoran population has been treated as a subspecies.

Description

Most of its plumage is gray brown to olive brown, but its chestnut belly and tail tips make it the most richly colored member of its genus. It has bare pink and blue skin around the eye.

Distribution and habitat

The rufous-bellied chachalaca is found in western Mexico from southern Sonora south to northwestern Jalisco. It inhabits tropical deciduous, semi-deciduous, and thorn forest and, along the coast, mangroves.

Behavior

Feeding

The rufous-bellied chachalaca forages in groups of up to 10, gleaning fruit from trees.

Breeding

Little is known about the rufous-bellied chachalaca's breeding phenology. Its breeding season appears to center around June. The clutch size is usually three eggs.

Vocalization

The rufous-bellied chachalaca's principal vocalization is a " loud, rhythmic, 4–5-syllable, chorus  'kirr-i-i-kr', 'chrr-i-k-rr' or 'chrr-uh-uh-rr' to which is sometimes added "loud cackling, whistling, or growling notes."

Status

The IUCN has assessed the rufous-bellied chachalaca as being of Least Concern. It is fairly common to common, even in habitats severely altered by humans, and is legally hunted.

References

rufous-bellied chachalaca
Endemic birds of Western Mexico
rufous-bellied chachalaca
rufous-bellied chachalaca
Taxonomy articles created by Polbot
Birds of the Sierra Madre Occidental
Sinaloan dry forests
Jalisco dry forests